The 1983 Burlington mayoral election was held March 1, 1983. Incumbent Mayor Bernie Sanders won with 52.12% of the popular vote against Democratic nominee Judith Stephany and Republican nominee James Gilson. 

The Democratic Party unsuccessfully sought to give its mayoral nomination to multiple politicians before choosing Stephany, who had launched her campaign hours before the selection caucus. She would later state that her late entry into the campaign had contributed to her defeat. In a 1985 survey, three-quarters of Democratic voters surveyed reported supporting Sanders in this election.

Candidates

Independent 

Following his election in the 1981 race, Mayor Bernie Sanders faced difficulties with the Burlington city council, with him being opposed by eleven of the thirteen members of the board of aldermen. The council opposed measures proposed by Sanders, overrode his vetoes on legislation, and refused to assent to his political nominations. Sanders formed a coalition between independents and the Citizens Party, with this coalition winning several seats in the 1982 city council elections. Sanders announced on December 3, 1982, that he would seek reelection as mayor at Burlington's city hall. On January 22, 1983, the Citizens Party voted unanimously to endorse Sanders, although the incumbent ran as an independent. He spent $33,000 during the campaign.

Democratic 
Judith B. Stephany, Minority Leader of the Vermont House of Representatives
William H. Williams, gas station owner

The Democratic Party of Burlington, Vermont, faced difficulties finding a mayoral candidate, as state senator Thomas Crowley, Chittenden County Chief Deputy State's Attorney Harold Eaton Jr. and Alderman James Burns all declined to run for the Democratic nomination. State senator Esther Sorrell considered running for the Democratic nomination, and an unsuccessful attempt was made to draft Mark Kaplan, also a state senator. Lieutenant Governor Madeleine Kunin also stated that she was not interesting in running for mayor despite polling showing her defeating Sanders. Alderwoman Joyce DeSautels frequently announced her wishes to run but was rendered an untenable candidate following her defeat to a Sanders-backed candidate in the 1982 city council elections and her subsequent criticism of the Burlington Democratic apparatus, with DeSautels accusing the party of being too accommodating with the mayor.

William H. Williams, a little-known gas station owner, was the first person to announce a campaign for the mayoralty when he announced that he would seek the Democratic nomination in August 1982. 

State Representative Judith B. Stephany, who was serving as minority leader in the Vermont House of Representatives, announced her mayoral campaign hours before the Burlington Democratic caucus was set to select the party's mayoral nominee. Stephany won the Democratic nomination against Williams by a margin of three to one. Stephany initially chose to retain her seat and leadership position in the House of Representatives, but later announced that she would resign on January 30, 1983, to campaign for mayor.

Republican 

James Gilson, the chairman of the Burlington School Board of Commissioners, announced on November 8, 1982, that he would run for the mayoralty as a Republican. He formally announced his candidacy at Burlington's city hall on November 12. Gilson won the Republican nomination with unanimous support on January 20, 1983.

General election
Sanders proposed a campaign spending limit of $15,000, but Gilson rejected the offer. Gilson accused Sanders of being anti-business and fiscally irresponsible, claiming that after-school programs Sanders had started were too expensive.

Stephany attempted to distance herself from the mayoralty of Gordon Paquette, which was seen as old-fashioned and unpopular; her campaign frequently stressed Sanders' poor relations with the Burlington board of aldermen, claiming that this made him an ineffective legislator. In spite of her generally liberal record, Stephany was opposed to abortion, which drew ire to her campaign from the feminist movement.

Polling

Endorsements

Results

Results by ward

Reactions
Stephany stated that her late entry into the election had contributed to her defeat, while Gilson's poor result was attributed to him being uncharismatic and a generally poor campaigner. Governor of Vermont Richard Snelling, when asked about the result, attributed Sanders' victory to Stephany and Gilson adopting negative campaigns, which were traditionally ineffective in Vermont. According to a survey of voters performed by political scientist Tom Rice in 1985, support for Sanders was strongest among working-class voters, with people making under $20,000 a year supporting him at significantly higher rates than those making above $20,000 a year.

Notes

References

Burlington, Vermont
1983
1983 Vermont elections
Bernie Sanders